Béni Maouche District is a district of Béjaïa Province, Algeria.

Municipalities
The district has 1 municipality:
Beni Maouche

References

Districts of Béjaïa Province